Tim Reed (born July 13, 1965) is an American politician. He is a Republican representing the 7th district in the South Dakota House of Representatives.

Early life 

Reed was born in Brookings, South Dakota. He holds a Bachelor of Science degree in Computer Science and Economics from South Dakota State University.

Political career 

Reed served as mayor of Brookings, South Dakota from 2009 to 2016.

In 2016, Reed ran for election to represent District 7 in the South Dakota House of Representatives. He was unopposed in the Republican primary, and won one of the two seats in the general election (the other going to Democrat Spencer Hawley). In 2018, Reed and fellow Republican Doug Post defeated two Democrats and one independent candidate. Reed was re-elected in 2020.

Reed currently sits on the following committees:
 Local Government
 Taxation
 Mental Health Services Delivery Task Force

Electoral record

References 

1965 births
Living people
Republican Party members of the South Dakota House of Representatives
People from Brookings, South Dakota
South Dakota State University alumni
21st-century American politicians